Robert Edward James Burns (3 June 1884 – 16 August 1949) was an Australian rules footballer who played with Collingwood in the Victorian Football League (VFL).

After playing two games for Collingwood in 1904, Burns moved to Perth to teach at the Christian Brothers College and played in the West Australian Football Association for the Perth and East Perth. He also coached East Perth.

He then left the country to study medicine at the University of Edinburgh, before moving again to become a doctor in Abertillery in Monmouthshire, Wales.

Notes

External links 

		
Bob Burns's profile at Collingwood Forever

1884 births
1949 deaths
Collingwood Football Club players
Richmond Football Club (VFA) players

Perth Football Club players
East Perth Football Club players
East Perth Football Club coaches
Australian medical doctors
Australian rules footballers from Victoria (Australia)
Australian emigrants to Wales
Alumni of the University of Edinburgh Medical School